Izz ad-Din Abd al-Aziz (d. 20 September 1406) was the younger brother of An-Nasir Faraj and the son of Barquq. He was briefly a Mamluk sultan of Egypt in 1405.

References

Burji sultans
15th-century Mamluk sultans
1406 deaths
Year of birth unknown
Circassian Mamluks